Glenn Ells is a former Member of the Legislative Assembly of Nova Scotia, Canada for the constituency of Kings North. He sat as a member of the Nova Scotia Liberal Party from 1974 to 1978.

A graduate of the Nova Scotia Agricultural College and McGill University, Ells was elected in the 1974 election.  In April 1978, he was appointed to the Executive Council of Nova Scotia as Minister of the Environment. He re-offered in the 1978 general election, but was defeated.

References

1934 births
Living people
Nova Scotia Liberal Party MLAs
Members of the Executive Council of Nova Scotia
People from Kings County, Nova Scotia
Nova Scotia Agricultural College alumni
McGill University alumni